Cumberland County is a coastal county located on the Delaware Bay in the U.S. state of New Jersey. As of the 2020 census, the county was the state's 16th-most-populous county, with a population of  154,152, a decrease of 2,746 (−1.8%) from the 2010 census count of 156,898. Its county seat is Bridgeton. Cumberland County is named for Prince William, Duke of Cumberland. The county was formally created from portions of Salem County on January 19, 1748.

The most populous municipality is Vineland, which had a 2020 population of 60,780; the largest municipality by area is Maurice River Township, which covered .

This county is part of the Vineland-Bridgeton metropolitan statistical area, as well as the Delaware Valley Combined Statistical Area. Geographically, the county is part of the South Jersey region.

History

Etymology
The county is named for Prince William, Duke of Cumberland who is best remembered for his role in putting down the Jacobite Rising at the Battle of Culloden in 1746, which made him immensely popular throughout parts of Britain.

Pre-settlement
The first people to populate Cumberland County were early descendants of the Lenape, also known as the Delaware, who include all Native American people who have lived in New Jersey  Water sources such as the Cohansey River and Maurice River made Cumberland County a resourceful environment for early native groups to utilize. Archaeological materials such as stone tools and pottery have been excavated in sites in Bridgeton, Fairfield, Greenwich and Stow Creek. Some of the earliest cultures that inhabited Cumberland County utilized clovis spear points which date to the Paleoindian period (10,000 BC to 8000 BC). As the climate switched from a tundra to woodlands during the archaic period (8000 BC to 1000 BC), ancestors of the Lenape developed axe technology, and later pottery during the woodland period (1000 BC to 1600 AD). The prehistoric period ended when European conquest arrived in the area bringing with it disease and warfare which ultimately killed or displaced much of the Native populations. Today, many Lenape people still reside in Cumberland County, such as the Nanticoke tribe who make up the Native American people from Southern New Jersey and the Delmarva Peninsula.

History
Early European settlement began with the Swedish who called what is now New Jersey New Sweden during the first half of the 17th century. Prior to the United States gaining its independence from Great Britain, Cumberland County was deemed separate from Salem County, and was named after the Duke of Cumberland in 1748. Cumberland County’s economic exploits were agricultural and manufacturing, more specifically the county focused on fruits and vegetables, as well as glassware and preserved foods. 

America’s early successes in glassmaking began in Southern New Jersey during the 18th century and eventually led to John Landis Mason of Vineland New Jersey to invent the mason jar for storing and preserving food at home during the 1850s. Cumberland County’s population has historically been “majority-minority”. Cumberland County went from holding one hundred and twenty enslaved people in 1790, to two by 1830. Cumberland County included several towns settled by Black Americans many of whom escaped slavery. Parts of the county were used for the Underground Railroad, and housed Harriet Tubman and William Still.

Maritime history
Along with agriculture and glassware, Cumberland County is also known for its maritime industries. Cumberland County’s main maritime export was oysters until the 1950s when disease destroyed the oyster population. With the oyster industry came shipbuilding in 1780. Later, the industrial revolution and railroad development increased the number of ships and the types of ships being made. By the late 19th century, ships switched from the sloop model to the schooner to be more useful for oystering. Whaling was also an industry in Cumberland County until 1775 when settlers turned to raising, farming, and trapping. Caviar was a short-lived industry in the area from the 1860s to 1925, when sturgeon had been overfished. 19th and 20th century maritime related artifacts such as ship models, building plans, tools, and rigging equipment can be viewed at the John Dubois Maritime Museum in Bridgeton.

Geography
Cumberland is a low-lying, generally featureless coastal county, with many salt marshes near the Delaware Bay.

Climate and weather

Cumberland has a humid subtropical climate (Cfa).

Demographics

2020 census
As of the 2020 United States census, the county's had 154,152 people, 51,360 households, and 34,309 families. The racial makeup was 45.4% White, 18.0% African American, 0.9% Native American, 1.2% Asian, and 2.6% from two or more races. Hispanic or Latino of any race were 34.4% of the population.

Of the 51,360 households, of which 26.8% had children under the age of 18 living with them, 38.9% were married couples living together, 18.4% had a female householder with no husband present, 9.3% had a male householder with no wife present and 33.2% were non-families, and 12.1% had someone living alone who was 65 years of age or older. The average household size was 2.68 and the average family size was 3.30.

About 23.8% of the population was under age 18, 7.5% was from age 18 to 24, 39.3% was from age 15 to 44, and 15.7% was age 65 or older. The median age was 38.1 years. The gender makeup was 51.7% male and 48.3% female. For every 100 females, there were 107.1 males.

The median household income was $54,587, and the median family income was $65,022. About 13.2% of the population were below the poverty line, including 17.1% of those under age 18 and 10.4% of those age 65 or over.

2010 census

Economy
Based on data from the Bureau of Economic Analysis, Cumberland County had a gross domestic product (GDP) of $6.1 billion in 2018, which was ranked 17th in the state and represented an increase of 1.6% from the previous year.

Government

County government 

Cumberland County is governed by a Board of County Commissioners which is comprised of seven members who are elected at large by the citizens of Cumberland County in partisan elections and serve staggered three-year terms in office, with either two or three seats coming up for election each year in a three-year cycle. Each Commissioner is assigned responsibility for one of the county's departments. In 2016, freeholders were paid $15,000 and the freeholder director was paid an annual salary of $16,000.

, members of the Cumberland County Board of County Commissioners (with party affiliation, residence and term-end year listed in parentheses) are 
Commissioner Director Douglas A. Albrecht (R, Vineland, term as commissioner ends December 31, 2025; term as director ends 2023), 
Deputy Commissioner Director Antonio Romero (R, Vineland, term as commissioner ends 2024; term as deputy director ends 2023),
John Capizola Jr. (D, Vineland, 2023; appointed to serve an unexpired term), 
Victoria Groetsch-Lods (R, Vineland, 2025), 
Carol Musso (D, Deerfield Township, 2023), 
Donna M. Pearson (D, Bridgeton, 2023) and 
Joseph V. Sileo (R, Vineland, 2024).

In January 2023, John P. Capizola Jr. was appointed to fill the commissioner seat expiring in December 2023 that had been held by George Castellini until he resigned from office earlier that month.

Pursuant to Article VII Section II of the New Jersey State Constitution, each county in New Jersey has have three elected administrative officials known as "constitutional officers." These officers are the County Clerk and County Surrogate (both elected for five-year terms of office) and the County Sheriff (elected for a three-year term). The county's constitutional officers are 
Clerk Celeste Riley (D, Bridgeton, 2024), 
Sheriff Robert A. Austino (D, Vineland, 2023) and 
Surrogate Douglas M. Rainear (D, Upper Deerfield Township, 2023).

The Cumberland County Prosecutor is Jennifer Webb-McRae of Vineland. First nominated by Governor of New Jersey Jon Corzine in January 2010, Webb-McRae was nominated for a second five-year term by Chris Christie in November 2016 and sworn into office after confirmation in January 2017. Cumberland County is a part of Vicinage 15 of the New Jersey Superior Court (along with Gloucester County and Salem County), seated in Woodbury in Gloucester County; the Assignment Judge for the vicinage is Benjamin C. Telsey. The Cumberland County Courthouse is in Bridgeton.

Federal representatives
New Jersey's 2nd congressional district includes all of Cumberland County.

State representatives

Law enforcement
The New Jersey Department of Corrections operates three correctional facilities in the county: Bayside State Prison, South Woods State Prison, and Southern State Correctional Facility. The three facilities employ 1,500 people and house one of every three state prisoners. In 2007, while the state was preparing to close Riverfront State Prison in Camden, it considered establishing a fourth state prison in Cumberland County.

Politics 
Cumberland County tends to lean towards the Democratic party. As of October 1, 2021, there were a total of 97,440 registered voters in Cumberland County, of whom 34,401 (35.3%) were registered as Democrats, 22,814 (23.4%) were registered as Republicans and 38,217 (39.2%) were registered as unaffiliated. There were 2,008 voters (2.1%) registered to other parties.

In the 2008 United States presidential election, Barack Obama carried the county with over 60% of the vote, which he did so again in 2012. However, since then, the county has taken a shift to the right and voted for Hillary Clinton by 6.1% in 2016. Joe Biden won the county by a slightly smaller 6.0% in 2020 despite the fact that Democrats improved their national popular vote total by 3.2%.

|}

In the 2009 gubernatorial election, Republican Chris Christie received 41.75% of the vote (14,079 votes) to Democratic Governor Jon Corzine's 50.69% (17,092 votes), while Independent Chris Daggett received 5.82% of the vote (1,962 votes), thus making Cumberland and nearby Camden County the only southern New Jersey counties to back the governor's re-election that year. In the 2013 gubernatorial election, Republican Governor Chris Christie received 56.7% of the vote (17,943 votes) to Democrat Barbara Buono's 41.4% (13,129 votes). In the 2017 gubernatorial election, Republican Kim Guadagno received 11,876 (41.8%) of the vote, and Democrat Phil Murphy received 15,686 (55.3%) of the vote. In the 2021 gubernatorial election, Republican Jack Ciattarelli received 55.6% of the vote (17,794 ballots cast) to Democratic Governor Phil Murphy's 43.6% (13,978 votes), making it one of three counties that Ciattarelli flipped.

Municipalities

The 14 municipalities in Cumberland County (with most 2010 Census data for population, housing units and area) are:

Transportation

Airports
The following public-use airports are located in Cumberland County:
 Bucks Airport (00N) in Bridgeton
 Millville Municipal Airport (MIV) in Millville
 Kroelinger Airport (29N) in Vineland

Roads and highways

Cumberland is served only by state and county routes. Major county routes that pass through include County Route 540, County Route 548 (only in Maurice River Township), County Route 550, County Route 552, County Route 553 and County Route 555.

State routes include Route 47, Route 49, Route 55, Route 56, Route 77, and Route 347. Route 55 is the only limited access road in the county which provides access to Interstate 76, Interstate 295, and the Philadelphia area to the north.

Parks and recreation
The only YMCA in the county is the Cumberland Cape Atlantic YMCA in Vineland.

Wineries 
 Cedar Rose Vineyards

Education
School districts include:

K-12
 Bridgeton Public Schools
 Millville Public Schools
 Salem County Special Services School District
 Vineland Public Schools

Secondary
 Cumberland County Vocational School District
 Cumberland Regional School District

Elementary

 Commercial Township School District
 Deerfield Township School District
 Downe Township School District
 Fairfield Township School District
 Greenwich Township School District
 Hopewell Township School District
 Maurice River Township School District
 Stow Creek School District
 Upper Deerfield Township Schools

See also

 National Register of Historic Places listings in Cumberland County, New Jersey
 Effie Maud Aldrich Morrison

References

External links

 

 
1748 establishments in New Jersey
Geography of the Pine Barrens (New Jersey)
Majority-minority counties in New Jersey
Populated places established in 1748
South Jersey